The New York Skyliners Drum and Bugle Corps (formerly the Raymond A. Garbarina Memorial Corps, and Garbarina Skyliners) are an A Class competitive senior drum and bugle corps based in New York City, and currently rehearsing in the Broome and Tioga County, New York area. The Skyliners were one of the original founding corps of Drum Corps Associates (DCA) and have won every major title available to a senior drum & bugle corps. The Skyliners are sponsored by American Legion Post #1523 in New York City.They have won the DCA World Championship three times, the DCA Open Class Championship twice, and the American Legion National Title twice.

History 
The New York Skyliners were formed in 1945 to create a corps for members of two New York City American Legion junior corps, The Phoebe Apperson Hearst Post #1197, and the Grand Street Boys from Post #1025, that were returning from service in World War II. Rehearsals were first held in 1945. They were officially accepted as a senior corps in the American Legion in 1946, and were named after Raymond A. “Gabby” Garbarina, a young man who played with both the Grand Street Boys and the Hearst Post corps, who had lost his life in the war. The new post was known as the Raymond A. Garbarina Memorial Post #1523, New York City. The corps itself was also known as the Raymond A. Garbarina Memorial Corps. After the 1949 season, the corps became known as the Garbarina Skyliners, and later, the New York Skyliners.. During the Skyliners' years in the American Legion League, they claimed the championship title three times. In 1964, the Skyliners, along with several senior corps in the northeastern United States, formed the Drum Corps Associates to establish a more formal competition format than the then-current haphazard collection of contests. The New York Skyliners succeeded in DCA, going on to win both several Open Class and Class A titles, before dwindling attendance forced the corps to remain inactive. In 2014, Director Larry Carbonell and Assistant Director Doreen Sandor revived the inactive corps and moved its location from New York to Scranton/Wilkes-Barre, Pennsylvania. In late 2022 the decision was made to shift the corps' rehearsal area to Upstate New York and reintroduce the 'New York' Skyliners name and historical logos.

Show Summaries 1950-Present 
Source:

DCA Championship Seasons

1966
Score: 84.530

Repertoire:  Charlie Welch (from Mr. Wonderful) * Columbia the Gem of the Ocean (from Thousands Cheer) * That Old Black Magic * Flight of the Bumblebee * Once in Love with Amy (from Where's Charley?) * Hava Nagila * Oklahoma (from Oklahoma!)

1971
Score: 91.500

Repertoire:  NY Montage * Little Old New York (from Tenderloin) * Longest Day * Alabama Jubilee * Lucretia McEvil * Comes Love * Slaughter on Tenth Avenue (from On Your Toes) * Little Old New York (from Tenderloin) * East Side-West Side Fanfare

1975
Score:  91.280

Repertoire:  How Could You Believe Me When I Said I Loved You * Hymn to Victory (from Victory at Sea) * West Side Story Medley * The Elks' Parade * Give My Regards to Broadway * East Side-West Side Fanfare

1999
Score:  74.900

Repertoire:  Mercy, Mercy, Mercy * Ya Gotta Try * Moonlight Serenade * The Duke Melody

2002
Score:  80.150

Repertoire:  New York State of Mind * You Brought a New Kind of Love * This Must Be Love * I Want More * Big Time * New York, New York

References

External links
 Official Site
 Skyliners Alumni Association
 Skyliners Historical Scores
 Skyliners Historical Repertoires
 Drum Corps Associates

Drum Corps Associates corps
Scranton, Pennsylvania
Veterans of Foreign Wars
Musical groups established in 1945
1945 establishments in New York City